The following are the national records in athletics in Moldova maintained by its national athletics federation: Federatia de Atletism din Republica Moldova (FAM).

Outdoor

Key to tables:

ht = hand timing

# = not ratified by federation

wo = women only race

Men

Women

Indoor

Men

Women

References
General
Moldovan Records 30 October 2019 updated
Specific

External links
 FMA web site
 Moldovan Athletics Records

Moldova
Records
Athletics
Athletics